La Boda is a 1982 Venezuelan film directed by  and co-produced by Universidad de los Andes. It is about the dictatorship of Marcos Pérez Jiménez (1948-1958). Public review about La Boda Urgelles handles with skill a complex movie that moves from present to past fluently. Several plots crosses in a wedding party, portraying not only Venezuela's transition from dictatorship to democracy in 1958, but the old and new typologies that characterized its people.

References

1982 films
Venezuelan drama films